Eastern Counties may refer to:

First Eastern Counties, English bus operating company formerly known as Eastern Counties Omnibus Company, now as First Norfolk & Suffolk
Eastern Counties Football League, football league in eastern England
Eastern Counties Railway, English rail company which became part of the Great Eastern Railway in 1862
Eastern Counties Regional Library, public library system in Canada
Eastern Counties Rugby Union, a rugby union governing body and rugby team in England
Eastern Counties 1, an English level 9 Rugby Union League
Archant, newspaper publishing company in eastern England known as Eastern Counties Newspapers until 2002
National Union of Agricultural and Allied Workers, former trade union in the United Kingdom initially known as the Eastern Counties Agricultural Labourers & Small Holders Union